Carex gravida, also known as heavy-fruited sedge, heavy sedge or long-awned bracted sedge, is a tussock-forming species of perennial sedge in the family Cyperaceae. It is native to southern parts of Canada and parts of the United States.

Description
The sedge can form a densely packed turf like arrangement with plants having no obvious rhizomes. The leaves are surrounded by loose sheaths. The  wdie leaves have green and white striping at the terminal end with transverse veins on the back.

Taxonomy
The species was first described by the botanist Liberty Hyde Bailey in 1889 as published in Memoirs of the Torrey Botanical Club. It has four synonyms;
 Carex gravida var. laxifolia L.H.Bailey in 1889
 Carex gravida f. laxifolia (L.H.Bailey) Kük. in 1909
 Carex gravida var. lunelliana (Mack.) F.J.Herm. in 1936
 Carex lunelliana Mack. in 1915.

Distribution
It is mostly found growing in temperate biomes in south eastern Canada in the province of Saskatchewan in the west through Manitoba to Ontario in the east. In the United States it is found as far west as Montana in the north down to Texas and New Mexico in the south west. The range extends to New York in the north east to around Virginia in the south east. It has been introduced into Delaware, Maryland and North Carolina.

See also
List of Carex species

References

gravida
Taxa named by Liberty Hyde Bailey
Plants described in 1889
Flora of Manitoba
Flora of Ontario
Flora of Saskatchewan
Flora of Arkansas
Flora of Colorado
Flora of Illinois
Flora of Wyoming
Flora of Texas
Flora of Indiana
Flora of Kansas
Flora of Iowa
Flora of Kentucky
Flora of Michigan
Flora of Minnesota
Flora of Missouri
Flora of Montana
Flora of Nebraska
Flora of New Mexico
Flora of New York (state)
Flora of North Dakota
Flora of South Dakota
Flora of Ohio
Flora of Oklahoma
Flora of Pennsylvania
Flora of Tennessee
Flora of Virginia
Flora of Wisconsin